Tonight with Arnold Clavio is a Philippine television talk show broadcast by 
Q and GMA News TV. Hosted by Arnold Clavio, it premiered on Q on April 5, 2010. The show concluded on Q on February 18, 2011. It started airing on GMA News TV on February 28, 2011. The show concluded on GMA News TV on March 11, 2020.

Production
In March 2020, the admission of a live audience in the studio and production were suspended due to the enhanced community quarantine in Luzon caused by the COVID-19 pandemic.

Accolades

References

External links
 
 
 

2010 Philippine television series debuts
2020 Philippine television series endings
Filipino-language television shows
GMA Integrated News and Public Affairs shows
GMA News TV original programming
Philippine television talk shows
Q (TV network) original programming
Television productions suspended due to the COVID-19 pandemic